Wettzell may refer to:

 , a district (village) of Bad Kötzting, Germany
 Geodetic Observatory Wettzell, located west of the village Wettzell
 38270 Wettzell, a minor planet